Court Waltzes is a 1933 musical film directed by Ludwig Berger and Raoul Ploquin and starring Fernand Gravey, Armand Dranem and Madeleine Ozeray. It was the French-language version of Waltz War, made by the German studio UFA and also directed by Berger. In the early years of sound it was common to shoot completely separate versions of films in different languages before dubbing became more established. It was part of a trend of operetta films released during the decade.

Cast
 Fernand Gravey as Franz
 Armand Dranem as Le juge
 Madeleine Ozeray as Queen Victoria
 Fernand Charpin as Joseph Lanner
 Pierre Mingand as Johann Strauss
 Janine Crispin as Katie
 Paul Ollivier as Le chambellan
 François Rozet as Prince Albert
 Arletty as La chocolatière
 Maximilienne as Une dame d'honneur
 Eric Roiné
 Nane Germon
 Jane Marken
 Willy Rozier
 Hélène Regelly

References

Bibliography

External links 
 

1933 films
German historical musical films
1930s historical musical films
Operetta films
1930s French-language films
Films directed by Ludwig Berger
Films directed by Raoul Ploquin
UFA GmbH films
German multilingual films
Films set in the 19th century
Films set in London
German black-and-white films
1933 multilingual films
1930s German films
French-language German films